The following is a list of Northeastern Line railway stations.

Stations in operation

See also 
Northeastern Line (Thailand)
Rail transport in Thailand

Railway stations
Thailand
railway stations
Lists of railway stations